—a yacht built in 1910 in New York at Port Jefferson on Long Island by I. M. Bayles & Sons—was acquired by the Navy on free lease from Mr. Farley Hopkins on 12 May 1917 though she was officially commissioned on the day before the transaction was completed. The vessel patrolled the waters of the 2nd Naval District to prevent incursions by German U-boats and to locate any mines laid by either U-boats or surface raiders. Alcalda was returned to her owner on 11 January 1919, and her name was stricken from the Navy list on that same day.

References
 
  NavSource Online: Section Patrol Craft Photo Archive Alcalda (SP 630)

1910 ships
Ships built in New York (state)
Patrol vessels of the United States Navy